The sixth series of the British comedy-drama television series Cold Feet was broadcast on the ITV network from 5 September to 24 October 2016. There are eight episodes and it is the first full series of Cold Feet since 2003.

Cast

Main 
 James Nesbitt as Adam Williams
 Robert Bathurst as David Marsden
 Hermione Norris as Karen Marsden
 John Thomson as Pete Gifford
 Fay Ripley as Jenny Gifford
 Leanne Best as Tina Reynolds
 Ceallach Spellman as Matt Williams

Recurring 
 Karen David as Angela Zubayr
 Art Malik as Eddie Zubayr 
 Daisy Edgar-Jones as Olivia Marsden 
 Ella Hunt as Ellie Marsden
 Jack Harper as Adam Gifford 
 Madeleine Edmondson as Chloe Gifford 
 Lucy Robinson as Robyn Duff
 Robert Webb as Grant Hodges

Guest 
 Jacey Sallés as Ramona Ramirez

Episodes

References

External links 
 

2016 British television seasons